Carl Wunsch was the Cecil and Ida Green Professor of Physical Oceanography at the Massachusetts Institute of Technology, until he retired in 2013. He is known for his early work in internal waves and more recently for research into the effects of ocean circulation on climate.

Career 

Wunsch received his Ph.D. in Geophysics at the Massachusetts Institute of Technology in 1966. He began teaching there in 1967, achieving tenure in 1970, and was named Cecil and Ida Green Professor of Physical Oceanography in 1976.

Climate change 
 
Wunsch was one of the scientists interviewed in the controversial documentary The Great Global Warming Swindle, but he complained that his views were grossly distorted by context.

Selected honors 

 Member, National Academy of Sciences, 1978
 Fellow, American Academy of Arts and Sciences, 1979
 Fulbright Scholar, 1981-1982
 Maurice Ewing Medal, American Geophysical Union and U.S. Navy, 1990
 Henry Stommel Research Award, American Meteorological Society, 2000
 Foreign Member, Royal Society of London, 2002
Member of the American Philosophical Society, 2003
 William Bowie Medal, American Geophysical Union, 2006

Selected publications 
Carl Wunsch, Discrete Inverse and State Estimation Problems, 2006.  	
Carl Wunsch, The Ocean Circulation Inverse Problem, 1996.  	
Walter Munk, Peter Worcester, and Carl Wunsch, Ocean Acoustic Tomography, Cambridge University Press, 1995.

References

External links 
 Homepage
 CV

American oceanographers
Foreign Members of the Royal Society
Living people
1941 births
Members of the United States National Academy of Sciences
Massachusetts Institute of Technology School of Science faculty
Massachusetts Institute of Technology School of Science alumni
Members of the American Philosophical Society